Quiet eye is a technique reported to improve outcomes in various tasks requiring human visual attention. It has been the subject of several articles in journalistic periodicals, and of scientific studies that evaluate it in relation to activities such as sports and surgical training.

History

Professor Joan Vickers is credited as the originator of quiet eye theory, and has been working on the topic since the early 1980s.

Applications and mechanism

Quiet eye theory can be used both to predict performance, and sometimes, as quiet eye training, as a means to improve performance.

Quiet eye training is hypothesised to work by improving attentional control, allowing greater cognitive effort to be devoted to the principal task and as such improving motor learning and the robustness of motor skills under pressure.

References 

Applied psychology